The Old Willow Community Center is a historic community building on West Willow Community Center Circle, off mile marker 69.7 of the Parks Highway in Willow, Alaska. It is covered by a broad aluminum gabled roof; the gable ends are finished in wooden shingles. The interior consists of a single large chamber. The building was constructed in 1961 as part of a community drive for a meeting space that was more spacious than the local railroad station. In 1992, it was moved a short way south of its original location, where the new community center and library now stand. The building continues to be used for community events.

The building was listed on the National Register of Historic Places in 2017.

See also
National Register of Historic Places listings in Matanuska-Susitna Borough, Alaska

References

Buildings and structures completed in 1961
Buildings and structures on the National Register of Historic Places in Matanuska-Susitna Borough, Alaska
Relocated buildings and structures in Alaska